Balak Island is an island located near Banggi Island in the Kudat Division on Sabah, Malaysia.

See also
 List of islands of Malaysia

References

External links 
 Balak Island on MyFishMaps.com

Islands of Sabah